Onota is a genus of beetles in the family Carabidae, containing the following species:

 Onota angulicollis (Reiche, 1842) 
 Onota bicolor Chaudoir, 1872 
 Onota elongata Chaudoir, 1872 
 Onota floridana G.Horn, 1881 
 Onota fulvella Bates, 1884 
 Onota limbipennis Maindron, 1906 
 Onota longipennis Maindron, 1906 
 Onota rutilans Chaudoir, 1872 
 Onota tenuicincta Chaudoir, 1872 
 Onota vitticollis Maindron, 1872

References

Lebiinae
Carabidae genera